Tetyana Robertivna Muinyo (born 7 December 1989), better known as Tanu Muino is a Ukrainian music video director, designer, stylist, photographer and film director. Known for her work on music videos by popular artists: Harry Styles' "As It Was", Monatik, Time and Glass, NK (Nastya Kamenskikh), IOWA, Cardi B's "Up", and Normani's "Wild Side".

Biography 
Her father is Robert Muiño, a Cuban national. In the 1980s, he came to Odessa on an exchange and stayed in Ukraine. Her mother is Ukrainian. Tanu has three brothers and a sister. Until the age of six, Tanu lived in Havana.

Career 
In 2016, she began collaborating with the Ukrainian singer Monatik. As of November 2020, Muino was the director of 14 Monatik videos.

In 2019, Muino directed the music video for "Small Talk" by American singer Katy Perry. 

In 2020, she collaborated with Spanish singer Rosalía. She directed Monatik's musical "Rhythm," which was released on his YouTube channel in September 2020. In the fall of 2020, she directed the video for "Cotton Candy" by the British musician Yungblud. The video was shot in Kyiv on 1 October. 

In 2021, she directed the music videos for Cardi B's "Up", Lil Nas X's "Montero (Call Me By Your Name)", and Normani's "Wild Side".

Music videos

Awards
The record holder for the number of awards in the category "Best Video Clip" of the annual Ukrainian YUNA award (won three years in a row: in 2016, 2017 and 2018). Winner in the category "Music Video Maker of the Year" according to the M1 Music Awards (2018).

In 2021, she won the MTV Video Music Award for Best Direction along with Lil Nas X for the music video of Montero (Call Me by Your Name).

References

Ukrainian music video directors
1989 births
Living people
Female music video directors
Ukrainian people of Cuban descent
Film people from Odesa